Kersoe is a hamlet in Worcestershire, England. It is at the foot of Bredon Hill an area of outstanding natural beauty.

Villages in Worcestershire